Aitaroun (or Aytaroun) is a Lebanese village located in the caza of Bint-Jbeil at 33.1156° North, 35.4722° East.  It is on the northern border of Israel and 125 km from Beirut.

The village's name origin is Itruma, which means the beautiful smell.

Archaeology 

Aitaroun contains a plethora of possible historic sites, many of which ransacked and their contents taken into Israel during the 22 year Israeli occupation. Untouched sites are still known to exist amongst locals within the greater village, though fear of greater looting and destruction of these sites has prevented their research.

Rumored archaeological finds in the village 

An approximate 3m long, white-limestone sarcophagus with Christian carvings. It is described to have had lions heads, one on each side, and a carving of what is believed to be a knight with a sword. The sarcophagus would have weighed several tons and was removed by heavy equipment in 2000 and taken into Israel under the supervision of the SLA.

A foundation stone of a synagogue that once existed in the village and that is considered to be around 600 years old. Removed by the Israeli military in the early 90s.

Theories behind archaeological sites in the village 
There are several theories behind the archaeological sites in Aitaroun. One theory is that the village was a pilgrimage site for early Christians and for its water sources, some of which are believed to have been visited by Jesus. This is supported by other archaeological sites in surrounding villages. Another theory is that the village was an ancient grave yard and an important trade route due to the water sources. Another theory is that the hills surrounding the village had been military outposts for ancient armies. The village is surrounded by rocky hills with narrow valleys as entrances, and this would have made it an easy place to protect from the high ground. Evidence of such outposts also exist on the tops of the surrounding hills. Another theory is that the village was part of a Roman olive and vineyard plantation outpost.

The village was mined for marble and there is evidence of vineyards. The variants of olives currently grown in the area also seem to be of Italian varieties grown for the purpose of olive oil.

There are historic locations of reservoirs, aqueducts or sources of water in the area, many have dried up. This may be due to heavy agriculture activities across the border in Israel over the last several decades.

History

Ottoman era
In 1596, it was named as a village, ’Aytarun in the Ottoman nahiya (subdistrict) of  Tibnin  under the liwa' (district) of Safad, with a population of 91 households and 15 bachelors, all Muslim. The villagers paid taxes on  agricultural products, such as wheat, barley,  goats and beehives, in addition to "occasional revenues” and a fixed sum; a total of 14,570 akçe.

Visiting in 1875, Victor Guérin described it as a village with 200 Metualis.

In 1881, the PEF's Survey of Western Palestine (SWP)  described it: "A large village, built of stone, containing 400 Moslems, situated in bed of wady, with olives, gardens and arable land. Water from a large birket and cisterns."

1985 South Lebanon conflict and aftermath 
During the South Lebanon conflict (1985–2000) Aitaroun was part of the South Lebanon security belt. Around 20 soldiers of the South Lebanon Army were kidnapped by Hezbollah in the final year of the war.

2006 Israel-Lebanon conflict 
During the 2006 Israel-Lebanon conflict, on July 16, 12 civilians from the  Akhrass family, including 7 Canadian nationals, were killed when their Aitaroun home were destroyed in Israeli airstrikes .

On July 18, 9 civilians from the Awada family were killed after Israeli air-strikes against their homes.

On July 19, 6 civilians were killed and 8 wounded by Israeli strikes, while they were trying to flee from Aitaroun.

The village lost 41 villagers to the war new figures said. Families laid flowers and read Quranic verses at the graves on October 23, 2006, which marks the Eid ul-Fitr-holiday.

Population 
Aitaroun is considered one of the larger villages in southern Lebanon with a total population estimated at 20,000 (2002).  However, the actual number of residents is now considered to be significantly higher.  The non-resident population is divided between emigrants and internal migrants distributed throughout Lebanon.  Approximately 45% of the population is under the age of 30 and the average family size is 6-7 members.

Economy 
Most families depend on agriculture as their primary source of income.  During the 22 year Israeli occupation (1978 to 2000), the village received a significant cash flow from forced (as well as hired) enlistment in the Israeli funded South Lebanon Army and through work in Israel.

Housing and infrastructure 
There are around 1,300 homes in the village. An electrical network was established in 1964 and access to telecommunications is fully restored since 2006. In 2005 a telephone exchange was installed in the village offering connectivity to Lebanon's telephone network. Mobile communications and internet connectivity were also fully restored.

During the occupation, potable water in the village was provided by water wells drilled in the village by Israel but that supply was severed with the withdrawal in 2000. The main water source is the collection of rain water which is stored in both private and public reservoirs.

Government and social services 
There are five schools operating in Aitaroun: two public and three private. Public schools, elementary
and intermediate, encompass 250 students, with a higher percentage of girls especially for the
intermediate level. The total number of students in the private schools amount to 570 distributed among one elementary school and two intermediate schools.  The village has one health center operated by the Ministry of Social Affairs.  The municipal council in the village was established in 1961.

Flora 
The area is rich in wild herbs, flowers and mushrooms. Particularly prevalent are the red poppy flower, wild capers and thistles.

Other flora that are believed to be more agricultural or introduced, include; grape vines, pomegranate trees, figs, cactus apple, sumac, various wild berries.

References

Bibliography

External links 
Survey of Western Palestine, Map 4: IAA, Wikimedia commons 
Aaytaroun, Localiban
 Video of a drive through the area
 Photomontage of the area's scenery
 http://www.ilo.org/public/english/standards/ipec/simpoc/lebanon/ra/tobacco.pdf

Populated places in the Israeli security zone 1985–2000
Populated places in Bint Jbeil District